The Sucupira River is a river in the state of Pará, Brazil. It is a left tributary of the Araguaia River.

The Sucupira River rises in the Serra das Andorinhas within the  Serra dos Martírios/Andorinhas State Park, created in 1996.
It flows southeast through the center of the park and the São Geraldo do Araguaia Environmental Protection Area to join the Araguaia from the left.

See also
List of rivers of Pará

References

Rivers of Pará